Dzianis Makhlai (born 19 September 1990) is a Belarusian sprint canoeist. He participated at the 2018 ICF Canoe Sprint World Championships.

References

1990 births
Belarusian male canoeists
Living people
ICF Canoe Sprint World Championships medalists in Canadian